Anne Fakhouri (3 March 1974 – 9 November 2022) was a French author, teacher, and anthologist. Her genres included fantasy and chick lit, commonly under the pseudonyms Elie Grimes or Hannah Bennett.

Biography
In 2008,  published the first book by Fakhouri, a youth diptych with the titles Le Clairvoyage and La Brume des jours, for which she received the Grand prix de l'Imaginaire in 2010. She changed themes in 2011 with Narcogenèse, an adult thriller. She then began writing youth and adult novels under pseudonyms.

Fakhouri died of cancer in Rennes on 9 November 2022, at the age of 48.

Books

Youth novels
 Le Clairvoyage (2008)
 La Brume des jours (2009)
 L'Horloge du temps perdu (2013)
 Hantés (2013)
 Piégés (2015)

Under the pseudonym Hannah Bennett
 Harper in summer (2017)
 Harper in fall (in love) (2018)
 Harper in winter (2018)
 Harper in spring (2019)
 Prudence et sa famille improbable (2020)
 Harper (15 ans). 1 : Les Secrets (2021)
 Harper (15 ans). 2 : Les Choix (2021)
 Harper (15 ans). 3 : Les Espoirs (2022)

Adult novels
 Narcogenèse (2011)
 American Fays (2014)

Under the pseudonym Elie Grimes
 Les gentilles filles vont au paradis, les autres là où elles veulent (2017)
 Mrs Stafford et le Capitaine Conrad (2021)

Anthologies
 Au travers du labyrinthe (2005)
 Fugue en ogre mineur (2006)
 Fées dans la ville (2009)

References

1974 births
2022 deaths
French speculative fiction writers
21st-century French novelists
Deaths from cancer in France
21st-century French women writers
French women novelists
Writers from Paris
21st-century pseudonymous writers
Pseudonymous women writers